Branco Mello (born Claudio Corrêa de Mello Júnior on March 16, 1962) is a Brazilian musician and actor, best known as the vocalist and bassist of Brazilian rock band Titãs. He has also played small but significant roles for the movies.

Childhood 
Music entered Mello's life through the cinema. Every week, his father would take him to watch musicals at Metro. The movies' soundtracks joined other influences, like Bossa Nova, or the shows promoted by his mother, Lu Brandão, a cultural producer.

At his adolescence, already nicknamed  ("White") by his friends, he listened to almost everything. Frank Sinatra, Glenn Miller, Gilberto Gil, Caetano Veloso, Chuck Berry, Little Richard, The Doors, Stray Cats, The Clash, João Gilberto, Raul Seixas, Tim Maia, Cartola, Zé Ketti are some of his favorite artists.

He decided to play the acoustic guitar. He and Marcelo Fromer, whom he met at Hugo Sacramento school, began to make the firsts partnerships. they would later briefly course linguistics at University of São Paulo, but quit it before they graduated. They even entered a music festival in Rio de Janeiro promoted by Brahma with two songs, although they were not selected. At that point they formed the Trio Mamão, with Tony Bellotto. Also at that time, they helped Serginho Groisman (which would later become the presenter of Altas Horas, a midnight program of Brazilian channel Globo) on the production of shows of famous Brazilian musicians, like Clementina de Jesus, Jorge Mautner and Luiz Melodia, three of Mello's idols.

Career 
In 1981, Mello and eight friends founded the band Titãs, at that time called Titãs do Iê-Iê.

In 1982, he was one of the presenters of TV Eclipse, a spectacle that parodied programs and featured almost all nine members that would later found the Titãs do Iê-Iê. At this spectacle Mello would play the role of a presenter who was a mixture of Flavio Cavalcante and Hebe Camargo.

His works for the cinema came up again in 1985, at the movie Areias Escaldantes, playing a small role of a sushi chef and a manicure.

At the first great break of the band, Mello joined Sérgio Britto, another member of the band, and the drummer Roberta Parisi and formed the band Kleiderman, where he sang and played the bass. The group presented strong lyrics and aggressive sound, and released an album called Con el Mundo a mis Pies (With the World at my Feet). In 2000, he formed the band S. Futuristmo. Although the objective of the band was only fun, they were invited to perform at Tenda Brasil do Rock 3, in January 2001.

At the end of the same year, Mello released a children project: the book/CD "Eu e Meu Guarda-Chuva" (Me and My Umbrella), which tells the story of a boy named Eugênio and his trusty umbrella. The CD comes with 10 songs made by him together with Ciro Pessoa, one of the founders of Titãs. The songs feature many famous artists, like Arnaldo Antunes, Elza Soares, Cássia Eller, Roberto Frejat, Toni Garrido and Marcelo D2. A movie with the same name was filmed based on the novel.

In May 2018, he was diagnosed with a tumor in his larynx, which forced him to step down from the band activities for three months. He was expected to be back in time to record the Doze Flores Amarelas DVD. In November 2021, the tumor returned, forcing him to spend 32 days at the hospital following another operation.

Personal life 
Mello lives in Rio de Janeiro with his wife, the actress and producer , his two sons Bento (born 1991) and Joaquim (born 1999), and his stepdaughter, Diana Bouth.

Discography

With Titãs

With Kleiderman 
 Con el mundo a mis pies

As producer 
 Inocentes – Pânico em SP (1986)

As Director and Producer 
 Titãs - A Vida Até Parece Uma Festa (2008)

As Music director 
 A Grande Família, O Filme (2007)

Guest appearances

References

External links 
 Mello's page at Titãs official web site
 Titãs official web site
 

1962 births
Living people
21st-century Brazilian male singers
21st-century Brazilian singers
Brazilian bass guitarists
Male bass guitarists
20th-century Brazilian male singers
20th-century Brazilian singers
Brazilian songwriters
Brazilian record producers
Brazilian composers
Brazilian male actors
Brazilian rock musicians
Brazilian children's writers
Titãs members
Musicians from São Paulo
University of São Paulo alumni